An open frame in ten-pin bowling refers to a frame in which the player makes neither a strike nor a spare. Bowling an open frame in a professional game is typically devastating enough to one's score to cause a loss. In bowling video games, open frames typically affects the player's in-game reputation, level, or experience points negatively, especially when a player's level is high enough; in some games, it may even cause the player's ranking or level to drop.

Ten-pin bowling